Oleksandr Pohorilko (born 16 April 2000) is a Ukrainian athlete. He competed in the mixed 4 × 400 metres relay event at the 2020 Summer Olympics.

References

2000 births
Living people
Ukrainian male sprinters
Athletes (track and field) at the 2020 Summer Olympics
Olympic athletes of Ukraine
Place of birth missing (living people)